Tim Wigley is an American lobbyist working primarily on resource and environmental issues. He is Executive Vice President of PAC/WEST Communications. He was formerly the president of the Oregon Forest Industries Council and worked as director of communications for pulp and paper company Georgia-Pacific. Wigley led the group Project Protect, which supported the Healthy Forests Initiative. He received a Bachelor's degree in Political Science from Southwestern Oklahoma State University, and is also a graduate of The American Campaign Academy in Washington, D.C.

Criticism
Wigley has been criticised for his alleged use of Astroturfing techniques in relation to the establishment of groups such as Project Protect and Save Our Species Alliance

References

 Wigley bio

American lobbyists
Year of birth missing (living people)
Living people
Southwestern Oklahoma State University alumni